Henrotin is a surname. Notable people with the surname include:

Charles Henrotin (1843–1914), American businessman
 Daniel Henrotin, comic book artist
Ellen Martin Henrotin (1847–1922), American social reformer
Sylvie Jung Henrotin (1904–1970), French female tennis player